The Mission of Armenia to the European Union is the diplomatic mission of Armenia to the European Union. It is based in Brussels, Belgium.

History 
Armenia has maintained diplomatic relations with the EU since 1991. The Mission of Armenia to the European Union was established to further facilitate Armenia–European Union relations.

Activities 

On 9 October 2020, Ambassador Anna Aghadjanian held a meeting with the President of the European Council, Charles Michel.

On 12 May 2021, Ambassador Anna Aghadjanian held a meeting with the President of the European Commission, Ursula von der Leyen. The sides discussed prospects for deepening EU–Armenia relations.

On 9 November 2021, the Mission hosted an event with the European Parliament's Friendship Group with Armenia. Members of the European Armenian Federation for Justice and Democracy also participated in the event.

On 21 November 2021, Armenia joined the Horizon Europe program, a signing ceremony was held in the Mission.

Ambassador 
On 31 July 2020, Ambassador Anna Aghadjanian was appointed Head of the Mission of Armenia to the EU. Aghadjanian assumed the position from previous Ambassador Tatoul Markarian.

See also 
 Armenia-EU Comprehensive and Enhanced Partnership Agreement
 Delegation of the European Union to Armenia
 Foreign relations of Armenia
 List of diplomatic missions of Armenia

References

External links 
 Official website
 Mission of Armenia to the EU on Facebook

Armenia–European Union relations
Armenia
European Union